Mankada is a hillside village in the Malappuram district of Kerala state. Mankada Kadannamanna Kovilakam was the seat of ruling family of the erstwhile Kingdom of Valluvanad.

Geography 
The Mankada Gram Panchayat is bordered the Cheriyam hills and other three major towns in Malappuram district, Malappuram, Manjeri and Perintalmanna. Most of the land is arable. Climate is very cool in the rainy season and usually dry in the summer season just like the other part of Kerala. The rainy season is from June to November, winter season from December to January and the rest of the year is sunny. The temperature is normal and ranges from 25 degree 35 degree. The terrain consists of small hills and upland plain. There is not many natural resources and most of the arable land is cultivated with permanent crops. Also, there are no major environmental issues or natural hazards.

History
Mankada was originally part of the Valluvanad Swaroopam dynasty in the early medieval period (12th century CE). Kadannamanna Kovilakam at Mankada was their seat of power. Valluvanad was an erstwhile princely state in the present state of Kerala, that extended from the Bharathappuzha river in the South to the Panthaloor Mala in the North. On the west, it was bounded by the Arabian Sea at Ponnani and on the east by the Attappadi Hills during their zenith in the early Middle Ages. The capital of erstwhile Valluvanad was at the present-day town of Angadipuram. Valluvanad was ruled by a Samanthan Nair clan known as Vellodis, similar to the Eradis of neighbouring Eranad and Nedungadis of Nedunganad. The rulers of Valluvanad were known by the title Valluvakonathiri/Vellattiri. According to local legends, the last Cheraman Perumal ruler gave a vast extension of land in South Malabar during his journey to Mecca to one of their governors, Valluvakonathiri, and left for pilgrimage. Valluvanad was famous for the Mamankam festivals, held once in 12 years and the endless wars against the Samoothiri of Kozhikode.

People 
As of the 2011 census, the total population of the Panchayat is 32,748. The sex ratio is almost normal. The people are highly literate. The literacy rate is 95.66 percent. Malayalam is the most-spoken as well as the administrative language. Cinematographer and director Mankada Ravi Varma was born here.

Economy 
The economy encompasses traditional village farming, small scale business, and foreign money.  A good percentage of natives are working in the Middle Eastern Countries. The local economy is currently undergoing a construction boom and which is solely dependent on the gulf money.  The main crops that are cultivated are coconut, arecacnut, paddy, and banana.  
Two gold load zones of highly potential sulphide rich high grade rocks have been found in recent explorations in mankada. The govt may head for the mining, if it can address the environmental issues.

Administration and other facilities
The panchayath is divided into 18 wards for administrative ease.  Development funds are coming to the village through panchayath allocations and the assembly and parliament allocations. The panchayath has a very good track record on development using the fund allocation from local governments. The road network and potable water accessibility is available to a good number of people. The panchayath has one Government Allopathic hospital, one Government-run Ayurvedic hospital and few other clinics. Other public amenities include four banks including State Bank of India, Federal Bank, Co-operative banks, one post office, public library, police station, and a stadium.

Transportation
Mankada village connects to other parts of India through Perinthalmanna town.  National Highway No.66 passes through Tirur and the northern stretch connects to Goa and Mumbai.  The southern stretch connects to Cochin and Trivandrum.   Highway No.966 goes to Palakkad and Coimbatore.   The nearest airport is at Kozhikode.  The nearest major railway station is at [(Angadippuram)], Tirur, and Shoranur Junction.

Education 
Though the literacy rate is high, most of the literacy rate was attained through the literacy drive of Kerala Literacy Mission. The panchayath has good number of primary and upper primary schools. The main educational institute is the A.m.u.p school Koottil,Government Higher secondary school Mankada, Government High School Cheriyam Mankada, Al Ameen English medium School Mankada, and NCT English medium school Verumpilakkal which has thousands of students.

Places of Interest
 Cheriyam hill viewpoint
 Mankada Kovilakam (Palace of Mankada)
 cheruthan paara cheriyam hill viewpoint

Notable people
 Mankada Ravi Varma

See also
 Mankada (State Assembly constituency)

References

External links 

 
 Mankada community website

Cities and towns in Malappuram district
Perinthalmanna area